The 2021–22 Texas State Bobcats women's basketball team represented Texas State University during the 2021–22 NCAA Division I women's basketball season. The basketball team, led by eleventh-year head coach Zenarae Antoine, played all home games at the Strahan Arena along with the Texas State Bobcats men's basketball team. They were members of the Sun Belt Conference.

Roster

Schedule and results

|-
!colspan=9 style=| Non-conference Regular Season
|-

|-
!colspan=9 style=| Conference Regular Season
|-

|-
!colspan=9 style=| Sun Belt Tournament

See also
 2021–22 Texas State Bobcats men's basketball team

References

Texas State Bobcats women's basketball seasons
Texas State Bobcats
Texas State Bobcats women's basketball
Texas State Bobcats women's basketball